Zaid bin Haritsah Mosque or Masjid Zaid bin Haritsah formerly known as Masjid Jamek Sungai Mulia is a mosque in Kuala Lumpur, Malaysia. This mosque is located at kilometre 8 of Jalan Gombak and it was opened in 1991.

See also
 Islam in Malaysia

References

Mosques in Kuala Lumpur
Mosques completed in 1991
1991 establishments in Malaysia